Clive Tyldesley (born 21 August 1954) is an English television sports broadcaster. He was ITV's senior football commentator from 1998 until 2020. In that role, he has led the ITV commentary team at four World Cups and four European Championships and been lead commentator on seventeen UEFA Champions League finals and a commentator on nine FA Cup finals for ITV. He won the prestigious Royal Television Society Sports Commentator of the Year in 1998, 2000, 2002 and 2005, and was voted the Sony Radio Awards' Sports Broadcaster of the Year in 1983.

He currently serves as a lead commentator for CBS/Paramount Plus on the English–language UEFA Champions League coverage in the U.S. and Rangers Football Club on their in-house Rangers TV service. 

In 2021 his first book was published by Headline: the semi-autobiographical Not for me, Clive.

Tyldesley was born in Radcliffe, Lancashire, and was educated at Bury Grammar School, Kirkham Grammar School and the University of Nottingham. He obtained an honours degree in Industrial Economics, but always wanted to pursue a career in sports commentating. In June 1975, he began his broadcast career straight from university with Radio Trent in Nottingham, where he became their regular Nottingham Forest reporter. In April 1977, he joined Radio City in Liverpool and remained there for the next twelve years. After succeeding Elton Welsby as City's sports editor, he covered the successes of Everton and Liverpool through the late 1970s and 1980s. Tyldesley was on-air at the scene of the Heysel Stadium disaster in 1985 but did not attend Liverpool's tragic FA Cup semi-final at Hillsborough in 1989. He was heavily involved in City's coverage of the aftermath of the disaster.

Early ITV career
For much of his radio career, Tyldesley had contributed match reports to ITV's World of Sport programme. In 1987, he began to work on Sportsweek, a late-night Granada Television sports programme featuring Welsby and Robert McCaffrey. During the next two years, Tyldesley began to split his working time between Radio City and Granada, who he eventually joined full-time in 1989. He became their main football commentator and also worked as a reporter and occasional presenter on their Kick Off and Granada Soccer Night programmes. Tyldesley's first television commentary was in August 1989, Liverpool v Manchester City on the opening day of the season. He became ITV's rugby league commentator in the north-west alongside Hull FC coach Brian Smith, and worked with Martin Tyler and Fred Trueman as a cricket commentator on Granada's coverage of Roses matches. Tyldesley's commentaries were now being broadcast on ITV network programmes, and he was chosen to be part of their commentary team at the 1990 FIFA World Cup in Italy. From 1989, he also became a regular reporter on Saint and Greavsie.

BBC (1992–1996)
Tyldesley received an offer to join the BBC's sports department in London in the summer of 1992. BBC's partnership with BSkyB enabled them to obtain highlights rights for the new Premier League in the spring of 1992, and they added Tyldesley to their established commentary team of John Motson, Barry Davies and Tony Gubba. For four years he contributed commentaries, voice-overs and film reports to Match of the Day and Sportsnight, working at the 1994 World Cup and the 1996 European Championship as a BBC commentator. Because of the pre-eminence of Motson and Davies, he only commentated on 4 live matches in as many years with the BBC and in 1996 he was offered a chance to return to ITV. Tyldesley's final weeks with the BBC were spent commentating on the basketball tournaments at the 1996 Olympic Games in Atlanta.

Return to ITV (1996–)
Tyldesley rejoined ITV in August 1996 as an understudy to Brian Moore, who he often cites, along with Motson and Reg Gutteridge, as the greatest influences on his commentary career. When Moore retired in 1998 following that year's World Cup final, Tyldesley became the network's lead football commentator. During his first season in that role, he commentated alongside Ron Atkinson on all of Manchester United's games in their successful Champions League campaign in addition to their FA Cup final victory in that treble season of 1999. His most famous commentary lines came during the dramatic climax of the Champions League final of that year when he asked, "Can Manchester United score? They always score" moments before their equalizing goal. "Name on the trophy", "Solskjaer has won it" and "Manchester United have reached the Promised Land" are other phrases from his commentary fondly remembered by United fans.
He has commentated on every Champions League final since 1998 for ITV, including dramatic successes for Liverpool and Chelsea as well as Manchester United. Tyldesley has been ITV's lead commentator at each European Championships since 2000 and World Cup since 2002. His regular co-commentators since Atkinson's resignation in 2004 have been David Pleat, Jim Beglin, Andy Townsend, and Glenn Hoddle. On 27 June 2016, Tyldesley was the ITV commentator for the English national team's shocking 2-1 loss to Iceland in the Round of 16 at the UEFA Euro 2016. "It's another wretched night for England at a major tournament. It's difficult to think of anything quite as humbling as this defeat, certainly in living memory," said Tyldesley after the final whistle. "This is the most abject failure that I can recall." He admits that football commentary is the only job he has ever really wanted to do since he was a child and regularly volunteers to speak to sports broadcast students at universities and colleges. Tyldesley says his only career disappointments were three unsuccessful interviews for BBC Radio Sport during the 1980s. He has the three rejection letters framed. He says his own personal favourite sports commentators are Pat Summerall and Brian Johnston.

Since 2019, he has called select games on NBC and NBCSN along with commentator Lee Dixon.

In July 2020, Tyldesley said he was "upset", "baffled" and "annoyed" as ITV promoted Sam Matterface to be senior commentator in his place. This sparked public controversy, with some news outlets falsely reporting that Tyldesley had been sacked. Later that year, he joined CBS Sports to be their lead commentator for the UEFA Champions League.

Video games
Tyldesley has provided and written scripts for the sound commentary on EA Sports FIFA series along with Andy Gray starting with FIFA 06. From 2011 to 2017 he mostly partnered Andy Townsend (PS2 and PSP (Only FIFA 12 to FIFA 14), PC, PS3 & PS4 - International Friendly (FIFA 12 - FIFA 17), Wii, 3DS, iOS and Android (FIFA 12 - FIFA 15)) who was also appeared before in the DS version of FIFA 11,  FIFA World Cup 2006,  UEFA Champions League 2006–2007, UEFA Euro 2008, 2010 FIFA World Cup South Africa, UEFA Euro 2012 and 2014 FIFA World Cup Brazil and options in commentary for FIFA 12 to FIFA 13. He also provided commentary for Championship Manager 2, the last in the franchise to feature verbal analysis, and the PlayStation video games This is Football and FA Premier League Stars 2001. Tyldesley has been host of the International Electronic Games Conference as part of the Edinburgh Festival on two occasions.

References

Living people
1954 births
English association football commentators
People educated at Kirkham Grammar School